Kirk H. Tomlinson (born May 2, 1968) is a Canadian former professional ice hockey centre who played in one National Hockey League game for the Minnesota North Stars during the 1987–88 NHL season. 

As a youth, he played in the 1981 Quebec International Pee-Wee Hockey Tournament with the Toronto Young Nationals minor ice hockey team. 

He is also a former head coach in the West Coast Hockey League, United Hockey League, and Central Hockey League.

Career statistics

See also
List of players who played only one game in the NHL

References

External links

1968 births
Adirondack Red Wings players
Canadian ice hockey centres
Fort Wayne Komets players
Hamilton Steelhawks players
Ice hockey people from Toronto
Kalamazoo Wings (1974–2000) players
Kitchener Rangers players
Las Vegas Thunder players
Living people
Minnesota North Stars draft picks
Minnesota North Stars players
Nashville Knights players
Oshawa Generals players
Peoria Rivermen (IHL) players